Leonard Johnson (born March 30, 1990) is a former American football cornerbacks who is currently a coaching assistant for the Buffalo Bills. He was signed by the Tampa Bay Buccaneers as an undrafted free agent in 2012. He played college football at Iowa State. He has also played for the New England Patriots, Carolina Panthers, Buffalo Bills, New York Giants, and Arizona Cardinals.

College career
Johnson attended Iowa State University from 2008 to 2011. As a freshman in 2008, he set an NCAA record for most kick return yards in a game with 319. During his career he started 43 of 50 games, recording 247 tackles and six interceptions.

Professional career

Tampa Bay Buccaneers

2012 season
On April 30, 2012, the Tampa Bay Buccaneers signed Johnson to a three-year, $1.44 million contract that includes a signing bonus of $5,000.

Throughout training camp, Johnson competed for a roster spot as a backup cornerback against E. J. Biggers, Brandon McDonald, Myron Lewis, and Anthony Gaitor. Head coach Greg Schiano named Johnson the fifth cornerback on the depth chart to begin the regular season. He was listed behind Aqib Talib, Eric Wright, Brandon McDonald, and E. J. Biggers.

During his rookie campaign he showed great promise when he finished the year with 41 tackles, 1 forced fumble, and 3 interceptions.

2013 season
In his sophomore campaign he improved his tackle stats to 62 tackles but only recorded 1 forced fumble and 1 interception.

2014 season
During his 3rd season he saw transition into a new Tampa 2 system installed by new head coach Lovie Smith and defensive coordinator Leslie Fraizer. He was used more in rotation as opposed to a full-time starter and finished his 2014 season with 45 total tackles, 3 forced fumbles, and 1 interception. Johnson was released from the Buccaneers on September 1, 2015, after breaking his leg early in the preseason.

2015 season
On March 10, 2015, the Tampa Bay Buccaneers re-signed Johnson to a one-year deal. On September 1, 2015, Johnson was waived by the Buccaneers. On September 2, 2015, the Buccaneers placed Johnson on season-ending injured reserve. On December 3, 2015, Johnson was waived from the Buccaneers' injured reserve.

New England Patriots
On December 9, 2015, Johnson was signed by the New England Patriots. He made his Patriots debut the following week in a 27-6 win over the Houston Texans and recorded two passes defensed. On February 17, 2016, Johnson was released by the Patriots.

Carolina Panthers
On July 14, 2016, Johnson signed with the Carolina Panthers. After starting the season on the reserve/non-football injury list after suffering an Achilles injury in March, Johnson was activated to the active roster on October 28, 2016.

Buffalo Bills
On March 17, 2017, Johnson signed with the Buffalo Bills. He played in 15 games with seven starts, recording 52 tackles and seven passes defensed.

New York Giants
On August 3, 2018, Johnson signed with the New York Giants. He was released on September 1, 2018.

Arizona Cardinals
On November 14, 2018, Johnson was signed by the Arizona Cardinals. He played in six games with one start before being released on December 28, 2018.

References

External links
 Iowa State Cyclones bio 
 Tampa Bay Buccaneers bio

1990 births
Living people
American football cornerbacks
American football return specialists
Arizona Cardinals players
Buffalo Bills players
Carolina Panthers players
Iowa State Cyclones football players
New England Patriots players
New York Giants players
Tampa Bay Buccaneers players
Buffalo Bills coaches